A front (front) is a type of military formation that originated in the Russian Empire, and has been used by the Polish Army, the Red Army, the Soviet Army, and Turkey. It is roughly equivalent to an army group in the military of most other countries. It varies in size but in general contains three to five armies. It should not be confused with the more general usage of military front, describing a geographic area in wartime.

Russian Empire 
After the outbreak of the First World War, the Russian General Headquarters set up two Fronts: Northwestern Front, uniting forces deployed against German Empire, and Southwestern Front, uniting forces deployed against Austria-Hungary.

In August 1915, Northwestern Front was split into Northern Front and Western Front.

At the end of 1916 Romanian Front was established, which also included remnants of the Romanian army.

In April 1917, Caucasus Front was established by the reorganization of the Caucasus Army.

Soviet fronts in the Russian Civil War 

The Soviet fronts were first raised during the Russian Civil War. They were wartime organizations only, in the peacetime the fronts were normally disbanded and their armies organized back into military districts. 
Usually a single district formed a single front at the start of the hostilities, or when hostilities were anticipated. Some military districts could not form a front. Fronts were also formed during the Polish-Soviet War of 1920.

The main fronts during the Russian Civil War and Polish-Soviet War were :
Northern Front (15 September 1918 – 19 February 1919) 
Western Front (12 February 1919 – 8 April 1924)
Southwestern Front (10 January 1920 – 5 December 1920)
Southern Front (September 1918 – January 1920 and September – December 1920)
Southeastern Front (30 September 1919 – 16 January 1920).
Eastern Front (13 June 1918 – 15 January 1920) 
Turkestan Front (23 February 1919 – 4 June 1926)
Ukrainian Front (January – June 1919)
Caspian-Caucasian Front (8 December 1918 – 13 March 1919) 
Caucasian Front (16 January 1920 – 29 May 1921)

Soviet fronts in World War II 

Army groups differ from fronts in that a Soviet front typically had its own army-sized tactical fixed-wing aviation organization. According to Soviet military doctrine, the air army was directly subordinated to the front commander (typically a ground commander). The reform of 1935 established that in case of a war the peacetime military districts on the border would split upon mobilisation each into a Front Command (taking control of the district's peacetime military formations) and a Military District Command (which stayed behind with the mission of mobilising the reserve formations and putting them at the disposal of the Fronts as replacement troops). In that sense the Air Armies were under Air Force command in peacetime, but under the command of the Front HQs in wartime; and the Fronts were commanded by ground-forces generals. An entire Front might report either to the Stavka or to a theatre of military operations (TVD). A Front was mobilised for a specific operation, after which it could be reformed and tasked with another operation (including a change of the Front's designation) or it could be disbanded - with its formations dispersed among the other active Fronts and its HQ reintegrated into its original Military District HQ.

Soviet and Russian military doctrine calls the different levels in the command chain (including the Fronts) "Organs of Military Control".

The degree of change in the structure and performance of individual fronts can only be understood when seen in the context of the strategic operations of the Red Army in World War II.

Soviet fronts in the European Theatre during the Second World War from 1941 to 1945:

 
Baltic Fronts
1st Baltic Front: Formed from Kalinin Front late 1943.
2nd Baltic Front: Formed from Bryansk Front on 10 October 1943.
3rd Baltic Front
Bryansk Front – Created 18 December 1941, to take sector between the Western and Southwestern Fronts. Disbanded 11/12 March 1943. Reformed from Orel Front 28 March 1943.
Belorussian Fronts (alternative spellings are Byelorussian Front and Belarusian Front)
1st Belorussian Front
2nd Belorussian Front
3rd Belorussian Front
Caucasus Front
Central Front
Crimean Front – formed January 1942 to reconquer the Crimea, incorporating 44th, 47th, and 51st Armies
Don Front
Far East Front
1st Far East Front
2nd Far East Front
Kalinin Front – the Kalinin Front was formally established by Stavka directive on 17 October 1941, and allocated three armies – 22nd, 29th and 30th. Renamed 1st Baltic Front Oct–Dec 1943.
Karelian Front – formed from Northern Front, along with Leningrad Front, on 23 August 1941.
Kursk Front
Leningrad Front – formed from Northern Front, along with Karelian Front, on 23 August 1941.
Moscow Defence Zone
Moscow Reserve Front
Mozhaysk Line of Defense
North Caucasus Front – redesignated TC Front's Black Sea Group of Forces, 1 September 1942
Northern Front – formed from Leningrad Military District on 24 June 1941
Northwestern Front – formed from Baltic Special Military District on 22 June 1941
Orel Front – created 24 March 1943 to defend opposite the tip of the German salient east of Orel. Composed of Western Front's 61st Army, Central Front's 3rd Army, and 15th Air Army. Redesignated Bryansk Front 28 March 1943.
Army Group of Primorye
Reserve Front – Front of Reserve Armies formed 14 July 1941
Southeastern Front – formed from armies on Stalingrad Front's left wing, 7 August 1942. Redesignated Stalingrad Front 28 September 1942.
Southern Front – renamed 4th Ukrainian Front 20 October 1943.
Southwestern Front – Formed initially on 22 June 1941. Reestablished 22 October 1942 between Don and Voronezh Fronts. Renamed 3rd Ukrainian Front 20 October 1943.
Stalingrad Front – Along with Voronezh Front, formed from remnants of Southwestern Front July 1942. Became Don Front 28 September 1942.
Steppe Front – renamed 2nd Ukrainian Front 20 October 1943.
Transbaikal Front
Transcaucasian Front – formed 23 August 1941
Ukrainian Fronts
1st Ukrainian Front
2nd Ukrainian Front
3rd Ukrainian Front
4th Ukrainian Front
Volkhov Front – formed 17 December 1941
Voronezh Front – renamed 1st Ukrainian Front 20 October 1943.
Western Front – formed from Western Special Military District on 22 June 1941

For constituent armies see List of Soviet armies.

Soviet fronts after World War II 

The Soviet Army maintained contingencies for establishing fronts in the event of war. During the Cold War, fronts and their staffs became groups of Soviet forces in the Warsaw Pact organization. The front was to be the highest operational command during wartime. Though there was no front ever established during peacetime the basic building blocks were maintained the established Military Districts. A front generally comprised 3–4 Combined Arms Armies and 1–2 Tank Armies though there was no set organization.

Poland 
A number of fronts were created by the Second Polish Republic from 1918 to 1939, among them being the Polish Southern Front. See :pl:Kategoria:Fronty polskie. In addition, the creation of a Polish Front was considered to group the First and Second Armies of the Polish Armed Forces in the East in 1944, and during the Warsaw Pact period, a Polish Front was created, seemingly as a mobilization-only organization.

Citations and notes

References
 John Erickson, The Road to Stalingrad: Stalin's War with Germany, Weidenfeld & Nicolson, London, 1975
 David Glantz, Colossus Reborn: The Red Army at War 1941–43, University Press of Kansas, 2005

Military units and formations by size